Laurie Webb (born September 5, 1985) is an American singer and songwriter.

As a songwriter, Webb worked for Curb Records and wrote for artists such as LeAnn Rimes, Marie Sisters, Audra & Alayna, Patsy Moore, Phil Keaggy, Amy Morriss, Heather Miller, Crystal Bernard, Jay Turner, Tamara Walker, Kenny Olson, 3 Track Mind and Emily White (together with Pebe Sebert). As a singer, she appeared on records by Godlikemouse, Faith Rivera, Harry Robinson, Delicious Blues Stew and Romantic Interludes. However, she is best known for her vocal samples on the popular software FL Studio and her songs "Aren't You Clever" and "Dance With Me", which have been remixed by countless DJs.

She has also made some guest vocal appearances on a few instrumental hip-hop songs produced by Newark, New Jersey-based composer Khiam Mincey.

Discography 
 2005 – Dance With Me
 2009 – Conscious Mind
 2011–  Optimum Momentum 
2019–  Pure Alkaline

References

External links
Official Website

American women singers
People from Nashville, Tennessee
Living people
Songwriters from Tennessee
1964 births
21st-century American women